Tom Lough (born Maurice Thomas Lough, July 14, 1942) is an American modern pentathlete. He graduated from Montevideo High School in Penn Laird, Virginia, in 1960, and from the United States Military Academy at West Point, New York, in 1964. He competed in the 1968 Summer Olympics.

References

1942 births
Living people
American male modern pentathletes
Olympic modern pentathletes of the United States
Modern pentathletes at the 1968 Summer Olympics
People from Harrisonburg, Virginia
Sportspeople from Virginia
20th-century American people